Duohemao Township (Mandarin: 多禾茂乡) is a township in Zêkog County, Huangnan Tibetan Autonomous Prefecture, Qinghai, China. In 2010, Duohemao Township had a total population of 8,912: 4,865 males and 4,406 females: 2,717 aged under 14, 5,704 aged between 15 and 65 and 491 aged over 65.

References 

Township-level divisions of Qinghai
Huangnan Tibetan Autonomous Prefecture